Jefferson Township is a township in Nodaway County, in the U.S. state of Missouri.

Jefferson Township was erected in 1871, and named after President Thomas Jefferson.

References

Townships in Missouri
Townships in Nodaway County, Missouri